Md. Azaharul Islam is a Bangladesh Awami League politician and the former Member of Parliament of Nilphamari-3.

Career
Islam was elected to parliament from Nilphamari-3 as a Bangladesh Awami League candidate in 1991.

References

Awami League politicians
Living people
5th Jatiya Sangsad members
Year of birth missing (living people)